Coxcomb Peak is a  mountain summit located on the common boundary of Hinsdale County and Ouray County, in Colorado, United States. It is situated nine miles northeast of the community of Ouray, in the Uncompahgre Wilderness, on land managed by Uncompahgre National Forest. It is part of the San Juan Mountains which are a subset of the Rocky Mountains, and is situated west of the Continental Divide. Neighbors include Precipice Peak 2.7 miles to the north, Redcliff one-half mile north, Matterhorn Peak 2.3 miles to the east-southeast, and nearest higher neighbor Wetterhorn Peak 1.8 mile to the southeast. The mountain's descriptive name, which has been officially adopted by the United States Board on Geographic Names, was in use since at least 1906 when Henry Gannett published it in the Gazetteer of Colorado.

Climbng 
The first ascent of the summit was made August 16, 1929, by Henry Buchtel and party via the Southwest Chimney. There is also an established climbing route on the North Face that was first climbed in August 1965 by Dick Yeatts, Mike Stults, Dick Guadagno, and Martin Etter. The best approach is via the valley of West Fork Cimarron River.

Climate 
According to the Köppen climate classification system, Coxcomb Peak is located in an alpine subarctic climate zone with cold, snowy winters, and cool to warm summers. Due to its altitude, it receives precipitation all year, as snow in winter, and as thunderstorms in summer, with a dry period in late spring. Precipitation runoff from the mountain's north aspect drains into tributaries of the Cimarron River, and from the south slope into tributaries of the Uncompahgre River.

See also

References

External links 

 Weather forecast: Coxcomb Peak
 Flickr photo
 Coxcomb Peak rock climbing: Mountainproject.com
 Coxcomb group: YouTube

Mountains of Hinsdale County, Colorado
Mountains of Ouray County, Colorado
San Juan Mountains (Colorado)
Mountains of Colorado
North American 4000 m summits
Uncompahgre National Forest